Magneuptychia is a genus of satyrid butterflies found in the Neotropical realm.

Species
Listed alphabetically.
Magneuptychia agnata (Schaus, 1913)
Magneuptychia alcinoe (C. & R. Felder, 1867)
Magneuptychia analis (Godman, 1905)
Magneuptychia divergens (Butler, 1867)
Magneuptychia drymo (Schaus, 1913)
Magneuptychia francisca (Butler, 1870)
Magneuptychia fugitiva Lamas, [1997]
Magneuptychia gera (Hewitson, 1850)
Magneuptychia gomezi (Singer, DeVries & Ehrlich, 1983)
Magneuptychia harpyia (C. & R. Felder, 1867)
Magneuptychia inani (Staudinger, [1886])
Magneuptychia iris (C. & R. Felder, 1867)
Magneuptychia lea (Cramer, [1780])
Magneuptychia libye (Linnaeus, 1767)
Magneuptychia metagera (Butler, 1867)
Magneuptychia mimas (Godman, 1905)
Magneuptychia moderata (Weymer, 1911)
Magneuptychia modesta (Butler, 1867)
Magneuptychia murrayae Brévignon, 2005
Magneuptychia mycalesis (Röber, 1927)
Magneuptychia nebulosa (Butler, 1867)
Magneuptychia newtoni (Hall, 1939)
Magneuptychia ocnus (Butler, 1867)
Magneuptychia ocypete (Fabricius, 1776)
Magneuptychia opima (Weymer, 1911)
Magneuptychia pallema (Schaus, 1902)
Magneuptychia pax (Huertas et al., 2016)
Magneuptychia probata (Weymer, 1911)
Magneuptychia segesta (Weymer, 1911)
Magneuptychia tiessa (Hewitson, 1869)
Magneuptychia tricolor (Hewitson, 1850)

References

Euptychiina
Nymphalidae of South America
Butterfly genera
Taxa named by Walter Forster (entomologist)